Furnivall Sculling Club is a rowing club based on the Tideway in Hammersmith, London.  It was for a time called Hammersmith Sculling Club.  It was founded in 1896 by Frederick Furnivall, after whom the riverside Furnivall Gardens a few metres away are named.  For its initial five years, in the reign of Queen Victoria, the club was for females only and is widely considered to have had the world's first female rowing team (crew). Furnivall has also admitted males since 1901.  The club colours are a precise pallette: myrtle and old gold.

History 
The club was founded by and is named after Frederick Furnivall (when he was 71, in April 1896). It was at the time called the Hammersmith Sculling Club for Girls. Given his passionate opposition to discrimination, he wanted to break into the man's world of river sport, by building a club for women.

In 1901, men were admitted to full membership, and the name was changed to Furnivall Sculling Club for Girls and Men. However until 1946 the captaincy was restricted to female members in honour of the founding premise. After his death in 1910 the club honoured his memory by celebrating 'The Doctor's Birthday' for many years.  Two female-only British rowing clubs exist: Barnes Bridge (which share premises with what was a men-only club) and Weybridge Ladies.

As at 2022, Furnivall has over 150 members, of whom about 120 are full, active members the balance being social, gym and honorary life members.

Furnivall underwent a major refurbishment in 2009 creating the club's ergometer facility, the John Robbins Room. A further set of works in 2019 and 20 modernised the building throughout. The club is one of four non-academic clubs along the Hammersmith bend and in the Borough of Hammersmith and Fulham as a whole, excluding the very small, closed 'Nautilus Club' who are based at British Rowing Headquarters, Hammersmith and who use Great Britain-ressemblent blades.  The clubs locally known as 'Furnivall', A.K. and 'Sons' form a cluster with a close rivalry and subtly different emphases on age, gender and abilities within their squads.

Honours

British champions

See also
Rowing on the River Thames
Frederick James Furnivall

Notes and references
Notes 
  
References

External links
 Official website

Tideway Rowing clubs
Sport in Hammersmith and Fulham
Rowing clubs of the River Thames